Robert Foxcroft (17 August 1934 – 20 November 2009) was a Canadian competitive fencer and sports coach. He competed at the 1964 and 1972 Summer Olympics and at three Pan American Games, two Commonwealth Games and two World Championships. He coached the Western University men’s and women’s fencing teams from 1969 to 1981 when they won four Ontario Championships.

References

1934 births
2009 deaths
Canadian male fencers
Olympic fencers of Canada
Fencers at the 1964 Summer Olympics
Fencers at the 1972 Summer Olympics
Fencers at the 1966 British Empire and Commonwealth Games
Fencers at the 1970 British Commonwealth Games
Sportspeople from London, Ontario
University of Western Ontario alumni
Commonwealth Games medallists in fencing
Commonwealth Games silver medallists for Canada
Commonwealth Games bronze medallists for Canada
Pan American Games medalists in fencing
Pan American Games bronze medalists for Canada
Fencers at the 1959 Pan American Games
Fencers at the 1967 Pan American Games
20th-century Canadian people
Medallists at the 1962 British Empire and Commonwealth Games
Medallists at the 1966 British Empire and Commonwealth Games